Great Saling is a village and former civil parish, now in the parish of The Salings, in the Braintree district of the county of Essex, England. The population of the civil parish at the 2011 Census was 282. It is near the town of Braintree. The hamlet of Blake End was part of the parish.

The village had on its green what was reputed to be the largest elm tree in England. With a girth of 22 feet 6 inches and a height of 40 metres, the elm was identified by the botanist R. H. Richens as an Ulmus × hollandica hybrid, before it succumbed to Dutch Elm Disease in the 1970s.

The village features the first aerodrome to be built by the Americans in this country. Work on Andrews Field aerodrome https://andrewsfield.com/ was started in July 1942 and built in under a year. List of units using the B-26 Marauder during World War II The aerodrome is named after one of the famous generals of the American air force, Frank M. Andrews. The runways were built with the hardcore that came from the ruins of the London blitz.

The parish church is dedicated to St James, and is in the Diocese of Chelmsford. It is Grade II* listed.

See also
 The Hundred Parishes
 Baron Haden-Guest

References 

Villages in Essex
Former civil parishes in Essex
Braintree District